Harry Barton (1874–1954) was an English professional footballer who played as a winger.

References

1874 births
1954 deaths
Sportspeople from Northwich
English footballers
Association football wingers
Castle True Blues F.C. players
Fairfield Athletic F.C. players
Grimsby Town F.C. players
Witton Albion F.C. players
Middlewich Athletic Rangers F.C. players
Northwich Victoria F.C. players
Watford F.C. players
English Football League players